Satyam is an Indian 2008 Tamil-language action drama film written and directed by debutante A. Rajasekhar (an associate of Suresh Krissna) in his directorial debut. The film stars Vishal in the role of a cop for the first time. Nayanthara plays the female lead role, while popular Kannada actor Upendra plays the parallel leading role as Vishal's mentor, making his Tamil debut. The film was simultaneously shot in Telugu as Salute, with a slightly different cast and locations. The film's score and soundtrack are composed by Harris Jayaraj. The film released on 14 August 2008. The film was produced by Vikram Krishna, Vishal's brother.

Plot
The plot opens with Sathyam, an Assistant Police Commissioner rescuing a hooligan from encounter thirsty cops around the Napier Bridge in Chennai (Hussain Sagar at Hyderabad in Telugu version), only to arrest him later. He reminds his fellow cops that a cop's duty is to kill crime not criminals. Sathyam meets his first challenge in tracking a mysterious killer of three ministers. In the process, he finds the culprit named Manicka Vel, only to receive a rude shock to know his identity. The murderer is none other than a former police officer based in Madurai (Pulivendula in Telugu version), who inspired Sathyam to become an honest police officer. Revealing the reason behind his change of mind, the ex-cop says that he is on a killing spree as he failed to set right things in khakhi uniform.

Sathyam, who throws a challenge at his mentor that he would use the power of law to put the wrongdoers behind the bars, vows to throw light on the illegal activities of the Home minister Kondal Dasan (Kondal Rao in Telugu version), who aims for the Tamil Nadu's/Andhra Pradesh's Chief Minister post.

In the meantime, he also has a romantic episode with Deivanayaki alias Deiva (Divya in Telugu version), a TV journalist. This begins with Deivanayaki suing the locality's children through their parents. The children swear vengeance through a 'gangleader' who happens to be none other than Sathyam himself. The 'gang' succeeds by making their rival a laughing stock with multiple pranks. Annoyance turns to love as Deiva and Sathyam get to know each other better.

During his attempts to establish the truth, Sathyam faces various troubles. The Minister's proxies give him various troubles by killing children by offering them ice creams laced with drugs to eat and killing his mother. When Sathyam arrests Acharya, the Minister's proxy, and takes him to court, the Minister's henchmen attack him while driving and Sathyam is stabbed. Thillanayagam (Dilli Babu in Telugu version), the other proxy, shoots Acharya and blames Sathyam. Sathyam performs his mother's funeral rites and is suspended from the force and jailed. Manicka Vel, to be released the next day, feels sad for Sathyam and laments his loss in the jail. Thillanayagam runs for MLA with the Minister's support so that he cannot be harmed by Sathyam. He gloats to Sathyam at the jail about his newfound power and challenges Sathyam's honor and dignity. At a public rally for Thillanayagam's candidature, the Kondal Dasan openly challenges and insults Sathyam, who is released from jail by a sympathetic officer and coming to disrupt the public rally. Manicka Vel stands in the corner aiming to kill Thillanayagam and the Dasan. Sathyam arrives and exposes the Minister and Thillanayagam by shooting them and forcing them to confess the truth about the Minister's intentions and the death of the proxy. Thillanayagam reveals everything about himself, Acharya, and Dasan. While lamenting the situation he is in and calling for reform, Sathyam is shot by the Minister's henchman and questions the honesty and trust his people and fellow officers have in him. Manicka Vel arrives on the scene and salutes Sathyam, with other officers following suit. A newscast is shown with Kondal Dasan and Thillanayagam being arrested and Sathyam is reinstated in the police force. Sathyam is promoted to Deputy Commissioner by the Chief Minister and marries Deivanayaki, and the credits roll.

Cast

Dubbing Artists
Savitha Reddy for Nayanthara (both Tamil and Telugu versions)
P. Ravi Shankar for Upendra (both Tamil and Telugu versions)
Kathiravan Balu for Ravi Kale (Tamil version)
M. S. Bhaskar for both Brahmanandam and Tanikella Bharani (Tamil version)
Sudhakar for Livingston (Telugu version)
Mallikarjuna Rao for Senthil (Telugu version)

Production

Development
Vishal trained hard for this role, pumping iron and sported a six pack, which he maintains in his subsequent films as of date. He has also sported a neat short-cropped hairstyle to look like a serious law-abiding police official. This is the first time he is undergoing image makeover for a film in order not to be stereotyped as an action hero.
Vishal's brother, Vikram Krishna Reddy, the film's producer, has revealed that the film is about police encounters, a very prominent issue regarding the laws of India. Hence, the protagonist's role runs parallel to that of Surya Sivakumar's in Kaaka Kaaka.
The film was touted to be a bilingual with the Telugu version titled Salute. Each scene was shot twice as Vishal had to wear a Tamil Nadu police uniform for the Tamil version and an Andhra Pradesh police uniform for the Telugu version.

Casting
Trisha Krishnan was originally selected to do the lead role in Sathyam. Later she was removed and the selection was then between Nayanthara and Shriya Saran. At last, Nayanthara was selected to play the female lead . The film marked the debut of Kannada actor Upendra in Tamil cinema.

Filming
Filming's first schedule began at Kadapa in August 2007, after Vishal completed the shooting for his previous action thriller, Malaikottai, and then the remaining schedules took place in Madurai, Chennai and Tiruvallur throughout February 2008. During the shooting of the climax fight scene in Hyderabad, thunder and lightning were an issue for both Vishal and Ravi Kale, and the former took treatment for 5 days, thus revising and stalling the final shoot. For the climax speech scene, Vishal sported a bald look for the first time to suit the scene. Shooting finally ended in May 2008.

Music
The film has five songs composed by Harris Jayaraj, "Sathyam" was his 25th film as music director, and the album was released on 14 March 2008 in Chennai, while the Telugu version, Salute's album was released on 4 June 2008 at Hyderabad. Lyrics are penned by Pa. Vijay, Kabilan & Yugabharathi. The soundtrack received generally positive reviews from critics. IndiaGlitz described the album as  "catchy" and stated that "Harris has given his heart out to package it with the right mix of songs. With good vocals and perfect rhythms, Sathyam songs would be remembered by music-lovers for a long time to come. Sathyam is one more jewel in Harris's crown". Behindwoods mentioned that "Harris Jayaraj has not disappointed us here. But at the same time there's nothing that sweeps us off our feet too."

References

External links

2008 films
2000s Tamil-language films
Fictional portrayals of the Tamil Nadu Police
Indian action films
Films scored by Harris Jayaraj
2000s masala films
Fictional portrayals of the Andhra Pradesh Police
Indian multilingual films
Films shot in Turkey
Films shot in Chennai
Films shot in Hyderabad, India
Films set in Chennai
Films set in Hyderabad, India
2008 multilingual films
2008 action films
2008 directorial debut films
Indian films with live action and animation